

Mother Cabrini High School (MCHS) was a Catholic high school located at 701 Fort Washington Avenue between Fort Tryon Park and West 190th Street, with a facade on Cabrini Boulevard, in the Hudson Heights neighborhood of Washington Heights in Upper Manhattan, New York City.

The school was established as "Sacred Heart Villa" in 1899 by Frances Xavier Cabrini (1850–1917) and was sponsored by the Missionary Sisters of the Sacred Heart of Jesus, the order she founded. It offered specialized and distinctive programs of study to enhance the education of its students, all female. The name was changed to Mother Cabrini High School when the current main building opened in 1930.

The school drew its students from "all over New York City and Westchester, with a large concentration of students from Manhattan and the Bronx." Through much of its history, the student body was largely the children of Irish and Italian immigrants, but by the time of its closure in 2014, the school was predominantly Latino, primarily from the Dominican Republic.

In January 2014, the school announced that it would close at the end of the school year.

From 1933 to 1959, the body of Mother Cabrini laid in repose in the school's chapel, until it was moved to the Cabrini Shrine that was built next to the high school.

Awards and recognition
Mother Cabrini High School was twice recognized with the Blue Ribbon School Award of Excellence by the United States Department of Education, the highest award an American school can receive.

Closure
On January 14, 2014, the Board of Trustees of the school announced on the school website that Mother Cabrini High School would close at the end of the school year, due to "increased costs and diminishing revenue." A post on the website elaborated, saying that the school's deficit had reached "unsustainable levels", despite a projected increase in enrollment and rental income. The deficit was blamed on:

  
Some of the school's alumni and parents of current students said they would try to save the school, but the Board believed that the deficit was insurmountable.

Cabrini was the second Catholic school to close in two years in the Washington Heights/Inwood area, after St. Jude School.  Four other Catholic schools remained in the area.

In April 2014 it was announced that Success Academy Charter Schools, a charter school operator with 22 locations in the city, would open a school in the Mother Cabrini High School building for the 2014–2015 school year.

References

External links

"Mother Cabrini High School, Front View, 1930". Museum of the City of New York. (photograph of the newly constructed school)

Defunct Catholic secondary schools in New York City
Cabrini Sisters schools
Girls' schools in New York City
Roman Catholic secondary schools in Manhattan
Washington Heights, Manhattan
1899 establishments in New York City
2014 disestablishments in New York (state)
Educational institutions established in 1899
Educational institutions disestablished in 2014